Siponto was an ancient port town and bishopric in Apulia, southern Italy. The town was abandoned after earthquakes in the 13th century; today the area is administered as a frazione of the comune of Manfredonia, in the province of Foggia. Siponto is located around 3 km south of Manfredonia.

History 
According to legend, Sipontum was founded by Diomedes, product of the union of the Homeric hero of the same name with the daughter of the king of the Daunians. Siponto was probably founded by the Daunians.

Sipontum was a flourishing Greek colony, its Greek name being Sipious (Σιπιούς); having fallen into the hands of the Samnites, it was retaken about 335 BC by King Alexander of Epirus, uncle of Alexander the Great. In 189 BC it became a Roman colony with its original Sipious name still used in Byzantine times, and in 663 AD it was taken and destroyed by the Slavs.

In the ninth century, Sipontum was for a time in the power of the Saracens; in 1042 the Normans made it the seat of one of their twelve counties. The latter won a decisive victory there over the Byzantine general Argyrus in 1052.

Michael of Zahumlje on 10 July 926 sacked Siponto, which was a Byzantine town in Apulia. It remains unknown if he did this by Tomislav's supreme command as suggested by some historians. Apparently, Tomislav sent the Croatian navy under Michael's leadership to drive the Saracens from that part of southern Italy and free the city.

Before the second half of the 12th century, the Knight Templar and the Hospitalier Order founded their first Italian fincas in the area of Capitanata, which spanned from Siponto to Foggia, including Spinazzola, Borgonioni, Salpi, Trinitapoli, Santa Maria de Salinis, Belmonte, Lama and Bersentino. They were devoted to animal husbandry, the commerce of marine salt, the depot of dietary goods, the olive and vineyard cultivation, as well to the use of natural waterfalls through mills. Such a skilful administration of their assets, grew the economic and military potential of the Orders, who were engaged in the Crusades and in the protection of local communities.

Some of the Knight Templar's masserie survived until the 21st century.
Lastly, Siponto produced one of the greatest medieval Jewish scholars, Rabbi Isaac ben Melchizedek, who composed one of the earliest commentaries on the Mishnah, a compendium of ancient Jewish oral law.

In 1223, a major earthquake centered on Monte Gargano destroyed nearly every building in Siponto. The tremors continued for another two years, until, by 1225, everything was in ruins.

Ecclesiastical history

Ancient bishopric 
According to legend, the Gospel was preached at Sipontum by Saint Peter and by Saint Mark. Another tradition relates the martyrdom of the priest Saint Justin and his companions under Gallienus and Maximian, about 255.

A bishopric of Sipontum (or Siponto) was established around 400 AD (or already in the third century according to others). The first bishop whose date may be fixed, was Felix, who was at Rome in 465.

Another legend reports that, in the time of bishop Laurence of Siponto, during the papacy of Gelasius I (492-496), the archangel Saint Michael appeared on Monte Gargano; in memory of the event, the Monastery of the Archangel was founded. Among the pilgrims were the emperors Otto III, Henry II, and Lothar III, and popes Leo IX, Urban II, and et Alexander III.

A bishop Felix is attested in 591 and 593, and a bishop Vitalianus in 597 and 599.

By about 688, Siponto was almost abandoned. The diocese was suppressed, and Pope Vitalian was obliged to entrust the pastoral care of Sipontum to the bishopric of Benevento.

New (arch)bishopric 

The see was re-established in 1034 as Diocese of Siponto, recovering its territory from the meanwhile Metropolitan Archdiocese of Benevento.

Suffragan Bishops of Siponto were :
 Bonus (1049? – 1059?)

In April 1050, Pope Leo IX held a synod at Siponto, at which he deposed two archbishops, who were charged with simony.

In August 1059, at the Synod of Melfi, Pope Nicholas II deposed the archbishop of Trani and bishop of Siponto. Archbishop Johannes of Trani, in his tomb inscription claimed to be "Archiepiscopus Tranensis, Sipontinensis, Garganensis Ecclesiae, atque Imperialis Synkellus."

 Guisard (attested 1062)

 Gerard (1066–74) Under bishop Gerardus, Siponto became the non-Metropolitan Archdiocese of Siponto in 1074.

Non-Metropolitan Archbishops of Siponto were :
 Giovanni (? – ?)
 Omobono (1087? – 1097?)

In 1090, the diocese of Siponto lost territory to establish the Diocese of Vieste.

In 1099 Siponto was promoted to the rank of Metropolitan Archdiocese of Siponto

Cathedral
The ancient cathedral remained still at Sipontum but, with the building of Manfredonia city by and named after King Manfred of Sicily, who decided to rebuild Siponto in a new nearby location, the archiepiscopal see was transferred to the new town in 1230, under its new title Metropolitan Archdiocese of Manfredonia (viz.), yet still Sipontin(us) as Latin adjective.

See also 
 list of Catholic dioceses in Italy
 Manfredonia Cathedral
 Roman Catholic Archdiocese of Manfredonia-Vieste-S. Giovanni Rotondo

Notes and references

Bibliography

Kamp, Norbert (1975). Kirche und Monarchie im staufischen Königreich Sizilien: I. Prosopographische Grundlegung, Bistumer und  Bistümer und Bischöfe des Konigreichs 1194–1266: 2. Apulien und Calabrien München: Wilhelm Fink 1975.
Kehr, Paulus Fridolin (1962). Italia pontificia. Regesta pontificum Romanorum. Vol. IX: Samnia – Apulia – Lucania .  Berlin: Weidmann. . pp. 230-267.
Lanzoni, Francesco (1927). Le diocesi d'Italia dalle origini al principio del secolo VII (an. 604). . Faenza: F. Lega, pp. 277-284; 291-294; 300-303; 165-168.

Sources and external links
 
 History of Siponto 

Former Roman Catholic dioceses in Italy
Frazioni of the Province of Foggia
Manfredonia
Colonies of Magna Graecia
Archaeological sites in Apulia
Roman sites of Apulia
Former populated places in Italy